Mount Thule is a mountain on Bylot Island, Nunavut, Canada. It is associated with the Baffin Mountains which in turn form part of the Arctic Cordillera mountain system.

References

Arctic Cordillera
Mountains of Qikiqtaaluk Region
One-thousanders of Nunavut